Lowell Jackson Thomas (April 6, 1892 – August 29, 1981) was an American writer, actor, broadcaster, and traveler, best remembered for publicising T. E. Lawrence (Lawrence of Arabia). He was also involved in promoting the Cinerama widescreen system. In 1954, he led a group of New York City-based investors to buy majority control of Hudson Valley Broadcasting, which, in 1957, became Capital Cities Television Corporation.

Early life 
Thomas was born in Woodington, Ohio, to Harry and Harriet (née Wagoner) Thomas. His father was a doctor, his mother a teacher. In 1900, the family moved to the mining town of Victor, Colorado. Thomas worked there as a gold miner, a cook, and a reporter on the newspaper.

In 1911, Thomas graduated from Victor High School where one of his teachers was Mabel Barbee Lee.  and began work for the Chicago Journal, writing for it until 1914. Thomas also was on the faculty of Chicago-Kent College of Law (now part of Illinois Institute of Technology), where he taught oratory from 1912 to 1914. He then went to New Jersey where he studied for a master's at Princeton University (he received the degree in 1916) and again taught oratory at the university.

Career 
Thomas was a relentless self-promoter, and he persuaded railroads to give him free passage in exchange for articles extolling rail travel. When he visited Alaska, he hit upon the idea of the travelogue, movies about faraway places. When the United States entered World War I, President Wilson sent him and others to "compile a history of the conflict", but the mission was not academic. The war was not popular in the United States, and Thomas was sent to find material that would encourage the American people to support it. He did not want to merely write about the war, he wanted to film it.

Lawrence of Arabia 

Thomas and cameraman Harry Chase first went to the Western Front, but the trenches had little to inspire the American public. They then went to Italy, where he heard of General Allenby's campaign against the Ottoman Empire in Palestine. Thomas traveled to Palestine as an accredited war correspondent with the permission of the British Foreign Office. In Jerusalem, he met T. E. Lawrence, a captain in the British Army stationed in Jerusalem. Lawrence was spending £200,000 a month encouraging the inhabitants of Palestine to rebel against the Turks. Thomas and Chase spent several weeks with him in the desert, although Lawrence had told them that it would be "several days". Lawrence agreed to provide Thomas with material on the condition that Thomas also photograph and interview Arab leaders such as Emir Feisal.

Thomas shot dramatic footage of Lawrence, then returned to America and began giving public lectures in 1919 on the war in Palestine, "supported by moving pictures of veiled women, Arabs in their picturesque robes, camels and dashing Bedouin cavalry." His lectures were very popular and audiences large, and he "took the nation by storm" in the words of one modern biographer. He agreed to take the lecture to Britain, but only "if asked by the King and given Drury Lane or Covent Garden" as a lecture venue. His conditions were met, and he opened a series at Covent Garden on August 14, 1919. "And so followed a series of some hundreds of lecture–film shows, attended by the highest in the land".

At the opening of his six-month London run, there were incense braziers, exotically dressed women dancing before images of the Pyramids, and the band of the Welsh Guards playing accompaniment. Lawrence saw the show several times. He later claimed to dislike it, but it generated valuable publicity for his book. To strengthen the emphasis on Lawrence in the show, Thomas needed more photographs of him than Chase had taken in 1918. Lawrence claimed to be shy of publicity, but he agreed to a series of posed portraits in Arab dress in London.

Thomas genuinely admired Lawrence and continued to defend him against attacks on his reputation. Lawrence's brother Arnold allowed Thomas to contribute to T.E. Lawrence by his Friends (1937), a collection of essays and reminiscences published after Lawrence's death.

Narration and Cinerama 
Thomas was a magazine editor during the 1920s, but he never lost his fascination with the movies. He provided the voice-over for the 1937 ski film Schlitz on Mt. Washington and narrated Twentieth Century Fox's Movietone newsreels until 1952, when he went into business with Mike Todd and Merian C. Cooper to exploit Cinerama, a film exhibition format using three projectors and an enormous curved screen with seven-channel surround sound. He produced the documentaries This is Cinerama, Seven Wonders of the World, and Search for Paradise in this format in 1956, with a 1957 release date.

Radio commentator and newscaster 
Thomas was first heard on radio delivering talks about his travels in 1929 and 1930: for example, he spoke on the NBC Radio Network in late July 1930 about his trip to Cuba. Then, in late September 1930, he took over as the host of the Sunday evening Literary Digest program, replacing the previous host, Floyd Gibbons.

On this program, he told stories of his travels. The show was fifteen-minutes long, and heard on the NBC Network. Thomas soon changed the focus of the program from his own travels to interesting stories about other people, and by early October 1930, he was also including more news stories. It was that point that the program, which was now on six days a week, moved to the CBS Radio network.

After two years, he switched back to the NBC Radio network but returned to CBS in 1947. He was not an employee of either NBC or CBS, contrary to today's practices, but was employed by the broadcast's sponsor Sunoco. He returned to CBS to take advantage of lower capital-gains tax rates, establishing an independent company to produce the broadcast which he sold to CBS. He hosted the first television news broadcast in 1939 and the first regularly scheduled television news broadcast beginning on February 21, 1940, over W2XBS (now WNBC) New York, which was a camera simulcast of his radio broadcast.

In the summer of 1940, Thomas anchored a television broadcast of the 1940 Republican National Convention, the first live telecast of a political convention, which was fed from Philadelphia to W2XBS and on to W2XB. He was not actually in Philadelphia but was anchoring the broadcast from a New York studio and merely identifying speakers who addressed the convention.

In April 1945, Thomas flew in a normally single-person P-51 Mustang over Berlin while it was being attacked by the Soviet Union, reporting live via radio.

In 1953, Thomas was featured in The Ford 50th Anniversary Show that was broadcast simultaneously on the NBC and CBS television networks. The program was viewed by 60 million persons. Thomas presented a tribute to the classic days of radio.

His persistent debt problems were remedied by Thomas' manager/investing partner, Frank Smith who, in 1954, became the President of co-owned Hudson Valley Broadcasting Company, which, in 1957, became Capital Cities Television Corporation.

The television news simulcast was a short-lived venture for Thomas, as he favored radio. It was over radio that he presented and commented upon the news for four decades until his retirement in 1976, the longest radio career of anyone in his day, since surpassed by Paul Harvey. His signature sign-on was "Good evening, everybody" and his sign-off was "So long, until tomorrow," phrases that he used as titles for his two volumes of memoirs.

Personal life 

Thomas' wife Frances often traveled with him. She died in 1975, and he married Marianna Munn in 1977. They embarked on a  honeymoon trip that took him to many of his favorite old destinations. Thomas died at his home in Pawling, New York in 1981. He is buried in Christ Church Cemetery.  Marianna died in Dayton, Ohio on January 28, 2010, after suffering renal failure.

Legacy and honors 
The communications building at Marist College in Poughkeepsie, New York is named in honor of Thomas, after he received an honorary degree from the college in 1981. The Lowell Thomas Archives are housed as part of the college library. In 1945, Thomas received the Alfred I. duPont Award. In 1971, Thomas received the Golden Plate Award of the American Academy of Achievement. In 1976, President Gerald Ford awarded him the Presidential Medal of Freedom. He has two stars on the Hollywood Walk of Fame and was inducted into the National Radio Hall of Fame in 1989. The Thomas Mountains in Antarctica are named for him.

Published works 
Among Thomas's books are:

With Lawrence in Arabia, 1924
The First World Flight, 1925
Beyond Khyber Pass, 1925
Count Luckner, The Sea Devil, 1927
European Skyways, 1927
The Boy's Life of Colonel Lawrence, 1927
Adventures in Afghanistan for Boys, 1928
Raiders of the Deep, 1928
The Sea Devil's Fo'c'sle, 1929
Woodfill of the Regulars, 1929
The Hero of Vincennes: the Story of George Rogers Clark, 1929
The Wreck of the Dumaru, 1930
Lauterbach of the China Sea, 1930
India--Land of the Black Pagoda, 1930
Rolling Stone: The Life and Adventures of Arthur Radclyffe Dugmore., 1931 See Arthur Radclyffe Dugmore
Tall Stories, 1931
Kabluk of the Eskimo, 1932
This Side of Hell, 1932
Old Gimlet Eye: The Adventures of General Smedley Butler, 1933
Born to Raise Hell, 1933
The Untold Story of Exploration, 1935
Fan Mail, 1935
A Trip to New York With Bobby and Betty, 1936
Men of Danger, 1936
Kipling Stories and a Life of Kipling, 1936
Seeing Canada With Lowell Thomas, 1936
Seeing India With Lowell Thomas, 1936
Seeing Japan With Lowell Thomas, 1937
Seeing Mexico With Lowell Thomas, 1937
Adventures Among the Immortals, 1937
Hungry Waters, 1937
Wings Over Asia, 1937
Magic Dials, 1939
In New Brunswick We'll Find It, 1939
Soft Ball! So What?, 1940
How To Keep Mentally Fit, 1940
Stand Fast for Freedom, 1940
Pageant of Adventure, 1940
Pageant of Life, 1941
Pageant of Romance, 1943
These Men Shall Never Die, 1943
Out of this World: Across the Himalayas to Tibet (1951)
Back to Mandalay, 1951
Great True Adventures, 1955
The Story of the New York Thruway, 1955
Seven Wonders of the World, 1956
History As You Heard It 1957
The Story of the St. Lawrence Seaway, 1957
The Vital Spark, 1959
Sir Hubert Wilkins, A Biography, 1961
More Great True Adventures, 1963
Book of the High Mountains, 1964
Famous First Flights That Changed History, 1968
Burma Jack, 1971
Doolittle: A Biography, 1976
Good Evening Everybody: From Cripple Creek to Samarkand, 1976; subtitled on cover "An Autobiography by Lowell Thomas"
So Long Until Tomorrow, 1977

Further reading

References 

Sources

 Bowen, Norman (ed) (1968) The Stranger Everyone Knows Doubleday
 Hamilton, John Maxwell (2011) Journalism's Roving Eye: A History of American Foreign Reporting LSU Press  pg 248

External links 

 
 
 With Lawrence in Arabia at Internet Archive
 
 
 Lowell Thomas interview at American Heritage
 "Creating History: Lowell Thomas and Lawrence of Arabia" online history exhibit at Clio Visualizing History.
 An Evening with Lowell Thomas (August 13, 1981), on the YouTube-channel of Pikes Peak Library District.

1892 births
1981 deaths
American broadcast news analysts
20th-century American businesspeople
American male journalists
American radio journalists
American travel writers
Peabody Award winners
People from Darke County, Ohio
Presidential Medal of Freedom recipients
University of Denver alumni
Princeton University alumni
Valparaiso University alumni
T. E. Lawrence
Royal Canadian Geographical Society fellows